Crenimugil crenilabis, the fringelip mullet, is a member of the ray-finned fish family Mugilidae widely found throughout the Indo-Pacific. This species can reach a length of  SL.

References

Randall, J.E., G.R. Allen and R.C. Steene, 1990. Fishes of the Great Barrier Reef and Coral Sea. University of Hawaii Press, Honolulu, Hawaii. 506 p.

crenilabis
Fish described in 1853
Taxa named by Peter Forsskål